Glutamicibacter creatinolyticus is a Gram-positive, non-spore-forming and aerobic bacterium from the genus Glutamicibacter which has been isolated from human urine in Japan.

References

External links
Type strain of Glutamicibacter creatinolyticus at BacDive -  the Bacterial Diversity Metadatabase

Bacteria described in 1998
Micrococcaceae